Unnao Municipal Corporation is municipal corporation of Indian city of Unnao. The municipality came into existence in 1869 with District Magistrate as its chairman.

References

External links
 

Unnao
Municipal corporations in Uttar Pradesh
1869 establishments in India